Arthur R. (Bud) Kudart (born July 27, 1930) was an American politician in the state of Iowa.

Kudart was born in Mount Vernon, Iowa. He attended Cornell College and the University of Iowa and is a lawyer. He served in the Iowa State Senate from 1979 to 1983 as a Republican.

References

1930 births
Living people
Iowa lawyers
Republican Party Iowa state senators
Cornell College alumni
University of Iowa alumni
People from Mount Vernon, Iowa